Debbie Bengtson (born 10 July 1957) is a Canadian former swimmer. She competed in the women's 400 metre individual medley at the 1972 Summer Olympics.

References

External links
 

1957 births
Living people
Canadian female swimmers
Olympic swimmers of Canada
Swimmers at the 1972 Summer Olympics
Sportspeople from Kitchener, Ontario
Canadian female medley swimmers
20th-century Canadian women